The 1965 Kentucky Wildcats football team represented the University of Kentucky in the Southeastern Conference during the 1965 NCAA University Division football season. The Wildcats scored 202 points while allowing 160 points, finishing 6-4 overall, 3-3 in the SEC.

Season
Rick Norton and Sam Ball were chosen as team captains.

Kentucky opened with a 7-0 win at Missouri.  Missouri finished the season ranked #6 in the nation, with a record of 8-2-1.  Kentucky entered Week 2 of the season ranked #10 in the country.

The second game was a 16-7 win against Ole Miss.  Kentucky advanced to a #6 ranking in the AP poll.

A loss at Auburn (23-18) was followed by a 26-24 win against Florida State.  A 31-21 loss at LSU was followed by a 28-10 win over Georgia and a 28-8 victory over West Virginia.  Kentucky then was ranked again in the AP poll, at #10.

Next was a 34-0 win over Vanderbilt.  Kentucky retained its #10 ranking in the AP poll.

At that point Kentucky was offered a bid to the Gator Bowl but turned it down, hoping for a better bowl invitation.  However, star quarterback Rick Norton suffered a broken leg in the next game, which ended up being a 38-21 loss at Houston, and a 19-3 loss to Tennessee left the Wildcats with a 6-4 record and no bowl game.

Schedule

Team players in the 1966 NFL and AFL Drafts

References

Kentucky
Kentucky Wildcats football seasons
Kentucky Wildcats football